Apocera colorata is a species of snout moth in the genus Apocera. It is found in Central America.

References

Moths described in 1914
Epipaschiinae
Moths of Central America